Sydney Dance Company is a contemporary dance company in Australia. The company has performed on stages around the world, including the Sydney Opera House in Australia, the Joyce Theater in New York, the Shanghai Grand Theatre in China, and the Stanislavsky Theatre in Moscow.

History 
Sydney Dance Company was founded in 1969 as the dance-in-education group Ballet in a Nutshell by Suzanne Musitz (Davidson), later changing its name to Athletes and Dancers, and Dance Company (NSW). From 1975–1976, the company was directed by Dutch choreographer Jaap Flier and later by Australian choreographer Graeme Murphy in 1976. In 1979, Murphy and his wife, Janet Vernon, who was also a dancer, changed the name to Sydney Dance Company and lead it for 30 years. Under their direction, the company toured internationally and was the first western contemporary dance company to perform in the People's Republic of China.

Part of Murphy's success has been his wide-ranging taste in music and the eclectic choices of musical accompaniment he has made for his dance works. The breakthrough work Some Rooms (1983), which received enormous acclaim, featured a selection of existing music by composers Keith Jarrett, Joseph Canteloube, Francis Poulenc, Benjamin Britten and Samuel Barber, whereas other works featured newly commissioned original music. Hate (1982) had a score by noted Australian composer Carl Vine, and his successful 1985 production Boxes featured original music by composer and musician Iva Davies, who was then the lead singer with popular Australian rock band Icehouse.

In May 2007, the company announced that Tanja Liedtke would be its new artistic director; however on 17 August of that year Liedtke was accidentally killed in a traffic accident in the northern suburbs of Sydney

In December 2007, Executive Director Noel Staunton launched the company's 2008 season, announcing three guest choreographers, Meryl Tankard, Rafael Bonachela and Aszure Barton, to create new works for the company. Bonachela was subsequently appointed the Company's new Artistic Director.

In December 2008, Foxtel signed a three-year sponsorship of the company involving special broadcasts and incorporating the company into subscription television programs Australia's Next Top Model and Project Runway Australia.

In December 2009, Anne Dunn was appointed Executive Director of the Company.

Rafael Bonachela has been the artistic director of the company since 2009. His first commissioned work for the company, 360°, was as a guest choreographer. His works include unfold (2009), 6 Breaths (2010), LANDforms (2011) and 2 One Another (2012), Irony of Fate, Soledad, and The Land of Yes & The Land of No. He has worked with guest choreographers Kenneth Kvarnstrom (Mercury 2009), Adam Linder (Are We That We Are 2010), Emanuel Gat (Satisfying Musical Moments 2010), and Jacopo Godani (Raw Models 2011). Other guest choreographers include Alexander Ekman and Gideon Obarzanek, as well as collaborations with the Australian Chamber Orchestra and the Sydney Symphony Orchestra and with composers 48nord and Ezio Bosso.

Following a number of years of negotiation, in 2014, the company announced it was granted permission to perform William Forsythe's rarely performed 1993 work Quintett. The work is set to Gavin Bryars' soulful Jesus' Blood Never Failed Me Yet.

Since Rafael Bonachela's appointment, the company has toured around the world to Venice, Beijing, Germany, New York City, Barcelona, London and Guanajuato.

Since 1985, the company has been a resident of the purpose-built studios at The Wharf in Sydney's Walsh Bay, minutes from the city's famed Bridge and Opera House. Its studios offer the largest public dance classes in Australia, with nearly 80,000 attendances annually.

Dancers and choreographers 
Sydney Dance Company has launched the careers of several notable Australian dancers and choreographers, including:
 Gideon Obarzanek, founder and former artistic director of Melbourne dance company Chunky Move
 Paul Mercurio who has gone on to make several movies including Strictly Ballroom which was directed by Baz Luhrmann.
 Stephen Page, now choreographer and director of Bangarra Dance Theatre
 Kim Walker, who spent ten years as Artistic Director of The Flying Fruit Fly Circus based in Albury, and took up the position of Executive Director at the National Aboriginal and Islander Skills Development Association (NAISDA) in 2007.
 Josef Brown, who has been playing the lead character Johnny Castle in the stage version of Dirty Dancing since it opened in Sydney in 2004

Awards

Mo Awards
The Australian Entertainment Mo Awards (commonly known informally as the Mo Awards), were annual Australian entertainment industry awards. They recognise achievements in live entertainment in Australia from 1975 to 2016. Sydney Dance Company won two awards in that time.
 (wins only)
|-
| 1989
| Sydney Dance Company
| Dance Performance of the Year
| 
|-
| 1990
| Sydney Dance Company - King Roger
| Dance Performance of the Year
| 
|-

References 

Culture of Sydney
Dance companies in Australia
Contemporary dance companies